The First Wives Club is a 1996 American comedy film directed by Hugh Wilson, based on the 1992 novel of the same name by Olivia Goldsmith. The film stars Bette Midler, Goldie Hawn, and Diane Keaton as three divorcées who seek retribution on their ex-husbands for having left them for younger women. The supporting cast comprises Stockard Channing as Cynthia; Dan Hedaya, Victor Garber, and Stephen Collins as the three leads' ex-husbands; and Sarah Jessica Parker, Elizabeth Berkley, and Marcia Gay Harden as their respective lovers. Supporting roles are played by Maggie Smith, Bronson Pinchot, Rob Reiner, Eileen Heckart, and Philip Bosco; cameo appearances include Gloria Steinem, Ed Koch, Kathie Lee Gifford, and Ivana Trump.

The film became a surprise box-office success following its North American release, eventually grossing $181,490,000 worldwide, mostly from its domestic run, despite receiving mixed reviews. It developed a cult following particularly among middle-aged women, and the actresses' highest-grossing project of the decade helped revitalize their careers in film and television. Composer Marc Shaiman was nominated for an Academy Award for Best Original Music Score, while Hawn was awarded a Blockbuster Entertainment Award and both Midler and Parker received Satellite Award nominations for their portrayals.

Plot
In 1969, four friends, Annie, Brenda, Elise, and Cynthia, graduate from Middlebury College. During a celebratory champagne toast, Cynthia has them promise always to be there for each other and takes a group photo.

In the present, the four women have lost touch. Cynthia learns through the tabloids that her ex-husband has remarried a much younger, more attractive woman. She sends notes to Annie, Brenda, and Elise and then commits suicide. Devastated by Cynthia's death, the three friends reunite at her funeral and learn of each other's marital troubles at lunch afterward. Annie is separated from her advertising executive husband, Aaron, and is in therapy for self-esteem issues. Elise is an alcoholic Oscar-winning actress in the process of divorcing her film producer husband, Bill, and relies on plastic surgery to keep hold of her fading career. Brenda is struggling financially after divorcing her husband, Morty, who runs a successful chain of electronics stores.

After the funeral, Aaron stuns Annie by asking her for a divorce so he can be with her therapist. Elise meets with a film director who tells her he envisions her playing the mother of the main character in his upcoming film. While shopping, Brenda runs into Morty and his beautiful, much younger girlfriend, Shelly, who insults Brenda's weight.

The women come together again once they receive the notes Cynthia mailed before her death, in which she describes her loneliness for their friendship. They form the First Wives Club to obtain restitution from their husbands.

Brenda and Annie learn from Brenda's Mafia-connected uncle that Morty's first electronics store sold stolen goods and that his books are fraudulent. Annie's daughter, who obtains a job at her father's advertising agency to spy on her father for Annie, reveals that Aaron's partners want to sell their share of the agency. Annie works up a scheme with Elise whereby Elise liquidates all of Bill's valuable assets acquired during their marriage and sells them for one dollar to Annie, who then auctions them off and uses the proceeds to buy out Aaron's partners. Unable to find any blackmail information on Bill, Elise gets into a vicious fight with Brenda and Annie while drinking. Annie contemplates leaving the club, but Brenda and Elise convince her to stay, with Elise promising to sober up.

Elise meets with Bill's young, attractive girlfriend, Phoebe, who is slated to play the main character in the film for which Elise is up for the part of the mother. She discovers that Phoebe is a minor and threatens to Bill that she will go public if he does not help her, Brenda, and Annie fund a non-profit organization dedicated to helping abused women. Brenda similarly threatens to expose Morty's tax evasion and Annie prevents Aaron from walking away from the advertising agency by bringing in a multi-million dollar account of her own. Bill, Aaron, and Morty all agree to the women's demands.

Annie, Brenda and Elise use their husbands' money to establish the Cynthia Swann Griffin Crisis Center for Women. At the grand opening celebration, Brenda and Morty seem headed for reconciliation, with Morty frustrated by Shelly's neediness; she later flirts with Bill. Elise is starring in a successful Broadway play and dating one of her fellow actors and a confident Annie rejects Aaron's request to come back to her. The women close up the center and dance down the street singing "You Don't Own Me".

Cast
 Bette Midler as Brenda Morelli-Cushman, a wise-cracking Sicilian-Jewish single mother who helped set her husband Morty on his feet financially, before he left her for his younger employee Shelly, cheating her out of an equitable settlement. She later blackmails Morty to get ownership of his business. However, when she realizes Morty is contrite about his sins, Brenda accepts attempts at reconciliation of their relationship.
 Michele Brilliant as young Brenda Morelli
 Goldie Hawn as Elise Eliot-Atchison, a former one-time Oscar-winning actress, now an alcoholic and heavy smoker relegated to B movies due to her "unprofitable" age. Her husband, Bill, who left her for another woman, is suing for alimony and insisting that all of their joint assets be sold and the profits divided between them. She liquidates their assets by selling them to Annie for a very low amount, and Annie auctions them so she can buy out her husband's partners. Elise also blackmails Bill about dating a minor.
 Dina Spybey as young Elise Eliot
 Diane Keaton as Annie MacDuggan-Paradis, the vehicle for the film's sporadic voice-over and its central character; an anxious and slightly neurotic housewife, saddled with self-esteem problems, attempting to save her marriage with estranged husband Aaron – much to her daughter's dismay. After Aaron has sex with her and then leaves her for her therapist, she decides to band together with Brenda and Elise to form the First Wives Club. Annie learns that Aaron is having problems with his advertising firm partners through the help of her daughter, and buys them out at the end of the film; making her the majority owner of Aaron's firm.
 Adria Tennor as young Annie MacDuggan
 Maggie Smith as Gunilla Garson Goldberg, a wealthy New York City socialite who helps the First Wives Club with their schemes because she was once a first wife, as well as a "second, third and fourth wife", according to Annie. She fools the social climbing Shelly into thinking Duarto Felice is a reputable decorator.
 Sarah Jessica Parker as Shelly Stewart, Morty's dim-witted but manipulative fiancée. It's indicated throughout the film that Shelly believes a position in high society can be obtained through money and the protagonists exploit her social-climbing attitude for their revenge. This is Parker's second film with Midler as her co-star, the first being the 1993 Disney film Hocus Pocus.
 Dan Hedaya as Morton "Morty" Cushman, Brenda's ex-husband, an electronics tycoon, who takes advantage of his former wife's having signed an out-of-court settlement – just to finance his girlfriend Shelly's extravagant taste. He's later blackmailed into giving Brenda a substantial amount of his money when she and her Uncle Carmine obtain proof of Morty's criminal activity. This later causes him to apologize to Brenda when he realizes Shelly only loved him because of his money, leading to his and Brenda's reconciliation.
 Stephen Collins as Aaron Paradis, Annie's conflicted husband and CEO of an advertising agency, who leaves his wife for their therapist, Leslie Rosen. Eventually he is left alone as Leslie runs off and Annie does not want him back.
 Marcia Gay Harden as Dr. Leslie Rosen, Aaron's short-time affair, who is the therapist for both Annie and Aaron. Leslie has been "helping" Annie with her self-esteem problems.
 Victor Garber as Bill Atchison, a successful film producer, who rose to fame through Elise's connections and eventually left her in favor of a young starlet.
 Elizabeth Berkley as Phoebe LaVelle, an up-and-coming actress, living with Bill. She presumably tells him that she is 21, but Elise investigates and reveals to Bill that she is 16 years old and a high school dropout.
 Eileen Heckart as Catherine MacDuggan, Annie's 'controlling' mother. By the end of the film, she tells Annie that she is proud of her and that she doesn't need anyone to make her happy.
 Bronson Pinchot as Duarto Feliz, Brenda's boss and (according to Annie) "one of the ten worst interior decorators in New York." He uses his role as decorator to help the First Wives Club sneak into Morty and Shelly's apartment.
 Stockard Channing as Cynthia Swann-Griffin, a college friend of the three main protagonists, who dies by suicide after her husband, Gil, leaves her and marries his young mistress three days after their divorce is finalized.
 Juliehera Destefano as Young Cynthia
 Jennifer Dundas as Christine "Chris" Paradis, Annie's lesbian and feminist daughter, who resents her father for what he is putting her mother through. She gets a job working at her father's advertising firm to spy on him for Annie. This is the second film in which Dundas plays Keaton's daughter, having previously done so in Mrs. Soffel.
 Ari Greenberg as Jason Cushman, Brenda's son, who is caught in an emotional battle between his parents.
 Philip Bosco as Uncle Carmine Morelli, Brenda's paternal uncle and part of her family's Sicilian Mafia connections. He is the one who informs Brenda that Morty had his stores stocked with stolen electronics, which the Mafia had done to help Morty and Brenda financially during the shaky early years of their marriage.
 Timothy Olyphant as Brett Artounian, a film director who is interested in casting Elise as the main character's aging mother in his new film.
 Aida Linares as Teresa, Cynthia's loyal maid.
 Ivana Trump as herself (special guest appearance).
 Kathie Lee Gifford as herself (special guest appearance).
 Ed Koch and Gloria Steinem as party guests (special guest appearances).
 James Naughton as Gil Griffin, Cynthia's ex-husband (special guest appearance).
 Heather Locklear as Gil's new wife (special guest appearance).
 Edward Hibbert as Maurice, a barman serving Elise as she drowns her sorrows
 J. K. Simmons as Federal Marshal
 Rob Reiner as Dr. Morris Packman, who warns Elise against overdoing it on plastic surgery.
 Gregg Edelman as Mark Loest
 Lea DeLaria as Elise's fan
 Debra Monk as jilted lover
 Kate Burton as woman in bed
 Walter Bobbie as man in bed

Development

Writing
The film project originally belonged to Sherry Lansing, who bought the unpublished manuscript of the novel in 1991, after many publishers had rejected it, and handed it over to producer Scott Rudin when she became CEO of Paramount Pictures in 1992. "It was one of the single best ideas for a movie I've ever heard," she said in a 1996 interview with The New York Times. "The situation of a woman getting left for a younger version of herself was far too common. But we didn't want a movie about women as victims. We wanted a movie about empowerment." Rudin consulted Robert Harling to write the screenplay, whose script was reworked by Paul Rudnick when Harling left to direct 1996's The Evening Star, the sequel to the 1983 drama Terms of Endearment. Rudnick, however, felt the final script was "incomprehensible": "To figure out the structure of that movie would require an undiscovered Rosetta Stone," he told The New York Times.

Casting
Bette Midler and Goldie Hawn were the first actresses reported to have landed one of the three starring roles. While Midler had wanted to play the "more glamorous role" of Elise at first, Rudin intended to cast Jessica Lange in the role before the team decided to rewrite the character of the book in favour of a "glitzier" version which eventually went to Hawn. Hawn, in turn, persuaded Sally Field to join the cast in the role of Annie but Field declined, citing her lack of musicality. The role eventually went to Diane Keaton who was cast by Rudin while they were working on the drama film Marvin's Room 

Mandy Patinkin was initially cast as Aaron, Annie's conflicted husband, but dropped out shortly before shooting started and was replaced by Stephen Collins when he decided to leave the project in favour of his musical ambitions. The role of Duarto originally went to writer David Rakoff though he was fired after only one day on set and replaced by Bronson Pinchot. Jon Stewart was hired to play the lover of Hawn's character Elise; however, his scenes were later cut from the final film. Dan Hedaya won the role of Morty, Brenda's ex-husband, over Héctor Elizondo.

Timothy Olyphant, who had impressed with local stage work, made his screen debut as director Brett Artounian in the film. Cameos of note include Ivana Trump (who famously stated in the film, "Don't get mad, get everything."), Gloria Steinem, and Kathie Lee Gifford as themselves, as well as author Olivia Goldsmith, director Hugh Wilson as a commercial director, and Heather Locklear as the younger lover of James Naughton's character Gil.

Production

Principal photography took place over three months at the Kaufman Astoria Studios in Queens, New York City, between December 4, 1995, and March 19, 1996. Among the 60 sites showcased on screen are Christie's auction house in the Delmonico's Hotel grand ballroom on Park Avenue, the Bowery Bar, a suite at The Waldorf-Astoria Hotel in Midtown Manhattan, Café des Artistes on One West 67th Street, the King Cole Bar at the St. Regis Hotel, Frank E. Campbell's funeral home, and Barneys. Other familiar sites include the Chrysler Building, the NoHo neighborhood, both 5th and 7th Avenues, Riverside Drive, and Central Park.

Production designer Peter Larkin took much inspiration from Hollywood's romantic comedies of the 1930s, incorporating a post-Great Depression view on style and luxury, widely popularized through these films. "Those sets looked better than real New York penthouses and nightclubs ever could," he said upon creation. "In this film I wanted settings that had that kind of striking nature."

Wilson has stated the making of the film was a difficult experience for him.

Music

Soundtrack

An official soundtrack album titled Music from the Motion Picture The First Wives Club... And Then Some was released on September 17, 1996, through Work, shortly before the film's premiere. The compilation peaked at number 90 on the US Billboard 200 chart.

Track listing

Score

Track listing
The film's original score, composed by Marc Shaiman, was also released on November 26, 1996.

Reception

Box office
The film also ranked 11th on the 1996 North American box office year-end list, while leading the yearly PG Rated 1996 chart.

In the United States and Canada, the film opened at number one at the box office, making $18.9 million in its opening weekend over September 20–22, 1996. It would remain another two weeks at number one, earning an estimated $42 million within its first month of release, a September record by then. Cited as the "sleeper of the year" by The Los Angeles Times, industry sources said that the film clicked with an untargeted group of ticket buyers who were overlooked as studios poured out special effects and loud action films during the summer of 1996.

Critical reception
The First Wives Club received mixed reviews from film critics. The review aggregator website Rotten Tomatoes reported that based on 74 reviews, 50% of critics gave the film a positive rating, with an average score of 5.6/10. The website's critical consensus reads: "The First Wives Club is headlined by a trio of comedic dynamos, but the script lets them down with tepid plotting and a fatal lack of satirical bite." On Metacritic, which uses a normalized rating system, the film holds a 58/100 rating, indicating "mixed or average reviews" based on 21 critics.

Edward Guthmann of the San Francisco Chronicle called the film a "terrific comedy" and "a glamorous revenge romp, a 9 to 5 mixed with Auntie Mame", giving "each star the opportunity to do her best work in a long, long time." He added that "what's surprising isn't that each of them is so delightfully good but that they work together so well." In his review for Variety, Leonard Klady found that director "Hugh Wilson wisely gets out of the way of his performers, providing a simple glossy look enhanced by cameraman Donald Thorin, designer Peter Larkin and the costumes of Theoni V. Aldredge". He noted that "with its combination of comic zingers and star turns, [the] pic shapes up as one of the more commercial fall [1996] entries", that "at its core, is a celebration of its star trio as consummate performers. In that respect, First Wives Club is a highly enjoyable movie romp."

Janet Maslin from The New York Times remarked that the film "freely overhauls the amusing beach book by Olivia Goldsmith, eliminating the sex, adding more slapstick and tailoring the leading roles to suit three divas in starring roles." While she felt that "Bette Midler, Diane Keaton and Goldie Hawn make a spirited, surprisingly harmonious trio," reeling off "one-liners with accomplished flair, even when the film turns silly and begins to, pardon the expression, sag", she found that the film fared "better with sight gags and quick retorts than with plot development". Roger Ebert, writing for the Chicago Sun-Times gave The First Wives Club two out of four stars. He declared the film "heavy on incident but light on plot", filled with "heartfelt talks with slapstick and sitcom situations." Owen Gleiberman, writer for Entertainment Weekly, wrote that "paced like a Chris Farley movie and photographed like a denture-cream commercial, The First Wives Club is the sort of overbright plastic-package comedy that tends to live or die by its jokes, its farcical audacity – anything but its 'conviction'." He gave the film a C+ rating.

Accolades
The First Wives Club earned composer Marc Shaiman his third Academy Award nomination. In 2000, the film earned recognition from the American Film Institute when it was shortlisted for the organization's AFI's 100 Years...100 Laughs listing.

Further developments

Sequel
For years there have been rumors of a sequel to the film. Although columnists Stacy Jenel Smith and Marilyn Beck reported in a 2002 article that producer Scott Rudin would refuse to work on a sequel, the actresses have made various statements to the contrary. In a Chicago Sun-Times interview in 2003, Keaton expressed her readiness to appear in a second film. A year later, writer Paul Rudnick reportedly started writing a draft, entitled Avon Ladies of the Amazon, and in 2005, Midler confirmed to USA Today that there was indeed a manuscript but that "the strike kept it from happening." However, as Hawn declared in a 2006 interview with the New York Daily News, Paramount Pictures declined the trio's services due to their demand for an increase in fees: "I got a call from the head of the studio, who said, 'Let's try to make it work. But I think we should all do it for the same amount of money.' Now, if there were three men that came back to do a sequel, they would have paid them three times their salary at least." On February 25, 2011, Goldie Hawn posted a picture on Twitter of the three at a lunch confirming that they had all signed on for a sequel, and the next day re-tweeted a message from Bravo TV confirming this again. In 2016, Hawn confirmed that Netflix was working on a sequel, though she also admitted that "the script isn't working."

On stage
A musical stage version of the film opened at The Old Globe Theatre in San Diego, California on July 17, 2009, in previews, through August 23, 2009, prior to a projected Broadway engagement. The book was by Rupert Holmes, with a score by the "one-time only reunited" Holland–Dozier–Holland songwriting team from 1960s Motown soul music fame. Francesca Zambello directed the San Diego production. The creators and Zambello were engaged for the project in 2006. An industry reading of the musical was held in February 2009, with principals Ana Gasteyer, Carolee Carmello and Adriane Lenox.

The principal cast in the San Diego production originally included Karen Ziemba as Annie, Adriane Lenox as Elise, Barbara Walsh as Brenda, John Dossett as Aaron, Kevyn Morrow as Bill, Brad Oscar as Morty, Sara Chase as Trophy Wife, and Sam Harris as Duane. Lisa Stevens choreographed, with scenic design by Peter J. Davison and costumes by Paul Tazewell. On June 16, 2009, Lenox dropped out of the production due to health concerns and was replaced by Sheryl Lee Ralph. The production's tryout received mixed to negative reviews, but the production sold approximately 29,000 tickets in its five-week run. The ticket demand was so strong early on that the show's run was extended an extra week prior to its opening night.

Producers announced November 11, 2009, that Francesca Zambello withdrew as director, and they would secure a new director prior to any Broadway run.

The originating producers, Jonas Neilson and Paul Lambert, teamed with Elizabeth Williams and John Frost, and have since brought on Simon Phillips to direct.

A newly adapted version of First Wives Club: The Musical began previews at Chicago's Oriental Theatre on February 17, 2015, with the opening on March 11 and running through March 29. The production aimed for Broadway in the 2015–2016 season. The new production is directed by Simon Phillips, choreographed by David W. Connolly, Kenny Seymour as musical director, and has a new book written by Linda Bloodworth-Thomason. The newly adapted version features new songs by the composers Holland-Dozier-Holland, the trio who wrote many Motown hits during the 1960s. The show also contains a few of their classic hits, such as "Reach Out...I'll Be There," "Stop! In the Name of Love" and "I Can't Help Myself (Sugar Pie, Honey Bunch)." Faith Prince, Christine Sherrill, and Carmen Cusack lead the cast as Brenda, Elise, and Annie respectively. Complete casting was announced in January 2015.

TV series

TV Land announced in March 2016, that it had ordered a pilot for a television adaptation of the film, to be written by Rebecca Addelman and executive produced by Jenny Bicks and Karen Rosenfelt. However, the network failed to pick up the pilot. The project went to the Paramount Network for redevelopment in early 2017. In October 2017, Tracy Oliver was tapped to write the series.

References

External links

 
 
 
 

1996 films
1996 comedy films
1990s buddy comedy films
1990s English-language films
1990s female buddy films
1990s feminist films
American buddy comedy films
American female buddy films
American feminist comedy films
American films about revenge
Lesbian-related films
Films about divorce
Films adapted into television shows
Films based on American novels
Films set in 1969
Films set in New York City
Films shot in New York City
Films directed by Hugh Wilson
Films produced by Scott Rudin
Films scored by Marc Shaiman
Paramount Pictures films
1990s American films